In Welsh mythology, Amaethon (, meaning "Amaethon son of Dôn") was the god of agriculture, and the son of the goddess Dôn. His name means "labourer" or "ploughman", and he is cited as being responsible for the Cad Goddeu, or "Battle of Trees", between the lord of the otherworld, Arawn, and the Children of Dôn (the Welsh version of the Tuatha Dé Danann).

Sources
The principal reference to Amaethon appears in the medieval Welsh prose tale Culhwch and Olwen, where he was the only man who could till a certain field, one of the impossible tasks Culhwch had been set before he could win Olwen's hand.

In the obscure early Welsh poem Cad Goddeu, a possible reference is made to Amaethon/Amathaon, but the passage is obscure. One possible interpretation, if the reading is accepted, is that he steals a dog, lapwing and roebuck from Arawn, king of Annwn (the otherworld), leading to a battle between Arawn and the Children of Dôn. Gwydion used his magic staff to turn trees into warriors who helped the children of Dôn win.

In one of the triads invented by Iolo Morganwg, he teaches magic to his brother Gwydion (this is not accepted as a genuine medieval triad by modern scholars).

Etymology
This theonym is derived from Proto-Celtic *Ambaxtonos meaning great follower, servant or ploughman, an augmentative form of ambactos (ultimately from *ambhi-ag-to-).

Notes

Bibliography

Ellis, Peter Berresford, Dictionary of Celtic Mythology(Oxford Paperback Reference), Oxford University Press, (1994): 
MacKillop, James. Dictionary of Celtic Mythology. Oxford: Oxford University Press, 1998. .
Wood, Juliette, The Celts: Life, Myth, and Art, Thorsons Publishers (2002):

External links
Celtic Gods and their Associates
Celtic Gods
Some Major Celtic Gods and Goddesses
Proto-Celtic — English lexicon

Agricultural gods
Welsh gods
Welsh mythology
Mabinogion